GOS may refer to:

Science and technology 
 gOS (operating system), a Linux distribution
 Gadolinium oxysulfide, an inorganic compound
 Galactooligosaccharide, carbohydrates found in milk
 Geographical Operations System, mapping and database software for telecommunications companies
 Global Ocean Sampling Expedition, an expedition assessing the genetic diversity in marine microbial communities
 Grade of service, a probability used in telecommunications to express the quality of voice service
 Grid-oriented storage, a dedicated data storage architecture for grid computers
 Galactic O star catalogue, an astronomical catalogue
 Glasgow Outcome Scale, for cerebral trauma

Other uses
 Gos (bird), also known as the northern goshawk
 Gos (Fils), a river of Baden-Württemberg, Germany, tributary of the Fils
 General ophthalmic services, health care services for the eyes
 Georgia Ornithological Society, in Georgia, United States
 Gloucestershire Old Spots, a breed of domestic pig
 Government Offices for the English Regions (GOs), former governmental organizations
 Grange-over-Sands railway station, in England
 Green Oasis School, in Shenzhen, China
 Gronings dialect of Low German
 Gross operating surplus, the surplus due to owners of incorporated businesses
 Somersby Airfield, IATA airport code "GOS"